Virginia Beatrice Smith (June 24, 1923 – August 27, 2010) was an American lawyer, economist, educator, and eighth president of Vassar College. Smith is the namesake of the Virginia B. Smith Innovative Leadership Award of the Council for Adult and Experiential Learning and the National Center for Public Policy and Higher Education.

Biography
Smith was born in Seattle, Washington, in 1923 and earned a bachelor's and law degree from the University of Washington, entering as an undergraduate at 16 years old.

Smith taught business courses at Berkeley in 1952, partly at the request of Clark Kerr, the former president of the University of California system. In 1965, Smith became the first woman assistant vice-president of Berkeley.

In 1963 Smith served as an associate director for the Carnegie Commission on Higher Education. President Richard Nixon appointed Smith the director of the Fund for the Improvement of Postsecondary Education in 1973.

Vassar College, previously an all-women's institution, admitted male transfer students in the Spring of 1969, and amended its constitution to permit male students to matriculate to Vassar. Appointed in 1977, Smith was the first president throughout whose term Vassar was entirely co-educational. Smith served as the president of Vassar College until 1986.

In 1990 Smith became president of Mills College in California after the College's trustees had moved to admit men to the college. The trustees reversed their decision, which Smith supported.

References

1923 births
2010 deaths
University of Washington School of Law alumni
Presidents of Vassar College
University of California, Berkeley faculty